The Battle of Wadkaltabu was a military engagement fought on 22 April 1837 between the forces of Kenfu Haile Giorgis, a nobleman of Qwara, and an Ottoman force led by Ahmad Kashif. The defeat nearly lead to an invasion of Ethiopia, which would not occur until the Ethiopian–Egyptian War, and was followed by more conflict, now involving Kassa Hailu, brother of Kenfu Hailu, who had fought in Wadkaltabu and would later become the Emperor of Ethiopia.

Background
Wadkaltabu was preceded by an Egyptian raid on Gonder and subsequent defeat at the hands of Kenfu Hailu a month prior at the Battle of Kalnabu. According to the British consul-general in Egypt: Rajab wad Bashir al-Ghul, a Sheikh the Rufaa people fled to Abyssinia after the Turks made Abu Rish, his brother, the sheikh. When he returned, four months later, with an army under Kenfu, he seized Abu Rish's women, slaves, and flocks, withdrawing back across the border. Khurshid, the Pasha at Er Roseires, heard of this from Ahmad Kashif and bribed one of Kenfu's men to betray Rajab, who was taken five months later  and brought to Khartoum in the spring of 1836 to be impaled.

Prelude
Ahmad Kashif wanted to make a punitive expedition against the Abyssinians. With a few troops he went forward and destroyed two villages, being met with resistance but taking a number of captives, among whom was a priest. Kenfu, in secrecy, raised an army to take revenge.

Battle
Incorrect intel reached the governor of the Sudan, who thought that Kenfu's force was small. Khurshid Pasha sent 600 men with the commandant of the 5th battalion, 400 Magharba cavalry and 200 Sha'iqiya horsemen. Counting the troops already in Al-Atish the total force amounted to 1,500 men, all under the command of Ahmad Kashif. As Ahmad crossed over into Abyssinian territory Kenfu advanced with an army of 20,000 men, who surrounded Ahmad's force and began attacking from all sides. Ahmad appealed to Salim Efendi, the commandant of the 5th battalion, for his professional advice, but Salim was angry about being subordinate to Ahmad and refused to help, answering that, as Ahmad was in command, he should give the necessary orders and he would carry them out. Ahmad Kashif was not cowardly but ignorant of military science and didn't know what to do. He asked Salim to take over, but Salim refused. Meanwhile, the Abyssinians were coming forward; there was no time to lose. Ahmad charged with the cavalry and Salim Efendi made a series of disorganized attacks on the enemy. After an hour of skirmishing the cavalry were taken prisoner, the regular troops fell back, and Ahmad Kashif escaped with a few horsemen. Kenfu took three important prisoners: Salim Efendi, Ali Agha al-Sahbi (chief of the Magharba Arabs,) ransomed later by his mother, and the chief of the Shaigiya tribe, who was also ransomed by his relatives.

Aftermath
Kenfu then returned, contented, to Gondar while Ahmad Kashif blamed the loss on Salim Efendi and said he thought Kenfu would be likely to return. Whether he was thoroughly frightened or wished to cover up Ahmad Kashif's shortcomings, Khurshid wrote to Cairo that there was a risk that the Sudan might be lost to Abyssinia. He reported the defeat of the force and his own deficiency in military strength and added that if he were sent a regiment of infantry or cavalry he would attack and defeat Kenfu in Gondar. This gave Muhammad Ali of Egypt some hope of conquering Abyssinia, which caused the preparation of an adequate force to be dispatched under Ahmad Pasha abu Adhan. Khurshid Pasha called 1,200, the normal size of a battalion, to Wad Medani, and another battalion was brought from Dongola. He had a total of 7,500 men, excluding reinforcements from Cairo. However, the Ottoman forces would not advance past Fazogli due to statements by English Consuls in Alexandria that William IV would not approve of an attack on Ethiopia.

References 

1837 in Africa
1837 in Ethiopia
Wadkaltabu
Wadkaltabu